Anthony McCarroll (born 4 June 1971) is an English drummer and one of the founding members of the English rock band Oasis, as their drummer from 1991 until his dismissal in April 1995. He played the drums on their debut album, Definitely Maybe, and on "Some Might Say", Oasis' first number-one single, from the album (What's the Story) Morning Glory?, before he was dismissed from the band in 1995.

Early life
Anthony McCarroll was born to Irish parents on 4 June 1971 in Levenshulme, Manchester, where he grew up. He has family in Ireland and spent a couple of years living there when he was younger due to his father's work. McCarroll got his first drum kit when he was six years old.

Career

Oasis
McCarroll had met Paul McGuigan while playing for the local football team at a young age. Together with McGuigan's friend Bonehead, they formed a band called The Rain and hired Chris Hutton as their singer, but he was sacked and replaced by Liam Gallagher not so long after, whom McCarroll had also known through childhood. Liam decided to change the name to Oasis, inspired by a poster for Inspiral Carpets that was hanging in his room.

Soon after, Liam's brother Noel joined. McCarroll has stated in his book that he was closely involved in the creation of several of Oasis's songs, including "Supersonic", despite Gallagher being given sole credit as songwriter.

Noel Gallagher and McCarroll got on during childhood, but as Oasis gradually became famous, the relationship between the two faltered. Gallagher has repeatedly publicly slammed McCarroll's drumming ability, saying it was not good enough for a number one single.After McCarroll's ejection from the band, Noel Gallagher stated in an interview with the Associated Press, "I like Tony as a geezer, but he wouldn't have been able to drum the new songs."

On the last day of April 1995, McCarroll's departure was announced and he was replaced by Alan White, who remained until 2004.

Oasis producer Owen Morris said of McCarroll, "Tony was quiet and always polite to me, but seemed out of his depth…so I think Tony did well to survive as long as he did in Oasis". Morris described McCarroll's drumming style as "extremely basic", but with timing and tempo that were "almost autistically perfect".

Lawsuit against the band
In 1999 McCarroll hired a solicitor Jens Hills – who had won Pete Best £2 million from The Beatles in 1995 – to sue Oasis for £18 million. Arguing McCarroll was owed his part of the band's five-album deal with Creation, the case hoped to set a legal precedent, as McCarroll would have claimed compensation for two LPs on which he had not played. Eventually, he accepted an out-of-court settlement of £550,000 in March 1999 and agreed to give up future royalties.

Life after Oasis
In an article building up to Oasis' seventh studio album Dig Out Your Soul in Q magazine in 2008, it was revealed that McCaroll was last seen in 2000 performing with the band Raika.

McCarroll's biography about his time in Oasis, entitled Oasis: The Truth, was released in October 2010.

McCarroll was also interviewed for the documentary entitled Oasis: Supersonic in 2016 and the audio was included in the film.

Personal life
On 30 August 2021, McCarroll revealed via Twitter that he had been admitted to hospital five days prior after suffering a heart attack, but stated that while he was "not out of the woods yet", his recovery was progressing well and thanked the NHS staff for their services. The following day, McCarroll tweeted that he was "all good" and had left hospital after having been fitted with a coronary stent to regulate his blood flow.

References

External links

Official Oasis website

Living people
English rock drummers
English people of Irish descent
Musicians from Manchester
Oasis (band) members
People from Levenshulme
1971 births
Britpop musicians
English expatriates in Ireland
21st-century drummers